The 2008 World Junior Ice Hockey Championship Division I was two international ice hockey tournaments, the second level of the 2008 World Junior Ice Hockey Championships.

Group A
The Group A tournament was played from 9 to 15 December 2007 in Bad Tölz, Germany.

Final standings

Results
All times are local.

Group B
The Group B tournament was played from 12 to 18 December 2007 in Riga, Latvia.

Final standings

Results
All times are local.

See also
 2008 World Junior Ice Hockey Championships
 2008 World Junior Ice Hockey Championships – Division I
 2008 World Junior Ice Hockey Championships – Division II
 2008 World Junior Ice Hockey Championships – Division III
 2008 World Junior Ice Hockey Championships rosters

References

I
World Junior Ice Hockey Championships – Division I
World
International ice hockey competitions hosted by Germany
International ice hockey competitions hosted by Latvia
Latvian